Michael Meyer , an American travel writer and the author of The Road to Sleeping Dragon: Learning China from the Ground up; In Manchuria: A Village Called Wasteland and the Transformation of Rural China; and The Last Days of Old Beijing: Life in the Vanishing Backstreets of a City Transformed. He graduated from University of Wisconsin–Madison. He first went to China in 1995 with the Peace Corps. Following Peace Corps, he graduated from the University of California, Berkeley, where he studied writing under Adam Hochschild and Maxine Hong Kingston.

His work has appeared in The New York Times, Time, Smithsonian, the New York Times Book Review, the Financial Times, Reader’s Digest, the Los Angeles Times, the Chicago Tribune, The Iowa Review, and on This American Life.

In China, he has represented the National Geographic Society’s Center for Sustainable Destinations, training China’s UNESCO World Heritage Site managers in preservation practices.

He divides his year between London and Pittsburgh, where he is a Professor of English at the University of Pittsburgh, teaching nonfiction writing. He is an avid long distance runner.

After a five-year clearance delay, his book The Last Days of Old Beijing was published in mainland China.

Awards
2017 Lowell Thomas Award winner for Best Travel Book
2016-17 National Endowment for the Humanities Public Scholar award
2015 Lowell Thomas Award winner for Best Travel Book
2014 Fellow, National Committee on US-China Relations Public Intellectuals Program 
2011 Rockefeller Foundation Bellagio Center residency
2010 Guggenheim Fellowship
2010 Fellow, Dorothy and Lewis B. Cullman Center for Scholars and Writers at the New York Public Library
2009 Whiting Award
2005 Lowell Thomas Award winner for excellence in travel writing

Works

Books
  (book interview)
  (book interview and book talk)

References

External links
"Author's website"
Profile at The Whiting Foundation

"Michael Meyer living in his Dazhalan Beijing hutong", British Television - Paul Merton

American travel writers
American male non-fiction writers
Peace Corps volunteers
Living people
University of Wisconsin–Madison alumni
Year of birth missing (living people)